Bamango is a village in the Lobaye region in the Central African Republic southwest of the capital, Bangui.

Nearby towns and villages include Bouaka (3.0 nm), Bogaye (3.2 nm), Banza (8.9 nm), Banguele (9.9 nm), Bobili (7.6 nm), Mongounda (8.4 nm), Bobeti(5.1 nm), Bomango (7.1 nm) and Tobale (7.1 nm) .

References 

Populated places in Lobaye